David B. Schwartz is a comic book writer.

His first published work was in New Mutants Annual #6 (Marvel Comics, 1990). Most notable work is MELTDOWN (Image Comics), which received significant accolades and was named to several annual Top 10 lists for 2006 and 2007.

Since Meltdown, he's worked primarily for Aspen Comics, first on their "Shrugged" spin-off "Aspen Showcase: Ember". At the 2009 San Diego Comic-Con, Schwartz was announced as the writer of a new arc of Aspen Comics' series "Fathom", entitled "Fathom: Blue Descent". At the 2011 WonderCon, he was announced as the creator and writer of a new creator-owned series entitled "IDOLIZED", with Micah Gunnell as the artist for the series.

David also dabbled in screenwriting. Credits included the feature film Fighting Gravity (CC Films, 1997, winner of various film festival awards), and the syndicated sketch comedy TV series The Newz.
In addition to writing, David is an executive at The Walt Disney Company.

References
 Aspen Showcase: Ember Review on AICN: 
 Meltdown Reviews: 
 Comic Book Database Entry: 

Living people
Year of birth missing (living people)
American comics writers